Darren Collins (born 15 November 1967) is a former Australian rules footballer who played with Collingwood, Footscray and Fitzroy in the Victorian/Australian Football League (VFL/AFL).

Collins, a rover, was recruited to Collingwood from East Reservoir and was 17 when he made his VFL debut in 1985. He kicked 24 goals from his 15 appearances that season, to finish third in the Collingwood goal-kicking.

In 1987, Collins moved to Footscray, but played only one game that year. He appeared 13 times for Footscray in 1988 and played 10 games in 1989.

He played for Victorian Football Association club Port Melbourne in 1990, but was picked up by Fitzroy in the Midyear Draft and played four VFL games late in the season.

References

1967 births
Australian rules footballers from Victoria (Australia)
Collingwood Football Club players
Western Bulldogs players
Fitzroy Football Club players
Port Melbourne Football Club players
Living people